Harold Kenneth Brown (born 1934) is an American civil rights leader in San Diego, California. He graduated from San Diego State University (SDSU) in 1959 and became the first African American to hold administrative rank at the university. He founded chapters of the Congress for Racial Equality and was arrested repeatedly for protesting against racial discrimination. In 2011, SDSU inaugurated the "Harold K. Brown Civil Rights and African American Experience Collection" - a historical collection from the civil rights movement, consisting of thousands of photographs, documents and oral accounts, many from Brown's personal collection.

References 

1934 births
Living people
Activists for African-American civil rights
Activists from California
African-American activists
San Diego State University alumni